Kha may refer to:

 Kha (Bengali), a letter
 Kha (Cyrillic), a letter
 Kha (Indic), a consonant
 Ḫāʾ (sometimes khā), Arabic letter خ
 Kha, an ancient Egyptian architect and overseer, buried in TT8 
 Kitty Hawk Aircargo, ICAO airline designator